Werner Peak is the highest (1,550 m) and most conspicuous peak on the southeast side of Mercator Ice Piedmont. The peak rises just east of the north end of Norwood Scarp. A steep rock ridge on its north side is easily recognizable from any point on the ice piedmont. Photographed from the air by the United States Antarctic Service (USAS) on September 28, 1940. Surveyed by Falkland Islands Dependencies Survey (FIDS) in 1958. Named by United Kingdom Antarctic Place-Names Committee (UK-APC) after Johannes Werner (1468–1528), German astronomer and mathematician who probably first (1514) suggested the method of lunar distances for determining longitude.

Mountains of Graham Land
Bowman Coast